"Johnny and Mary" is a song written and originally performed by Robert Palmer. Palmer's version was recorded in 1980 at Compass Point Studios, New Providence, in the Bahamas. The song was featured on Palmer's album Clues (1980).

"Johnny and Mary" went to No. 44 on the UK Singles Chart, and was a top 40 hit in Canada, Australia, New Zealand, South Africa and several European countries. In Germany, it peaked at No. 7 on the singles chart and spent a total of 23 weeks in the top 20. In Spain, it peaked at No. 1 on the Spanish singles chart (AFYVE).

Though the single did not chart in the US Hot 100, it did reach No. 18 on Billboards Club Play Singles chart.

"Johnny and Mary" was used as the signature tune in advertisements promoting Renault cars throughout the 1980s and 1990s. Early adverts used Palmer's original version, while a range of special recordings in different styles were produced during the 1990s, most famously an acoustic interpretation by Martin Taylor, which he released on his album Spirit of Django. Taylor recorded alternate versions for Renault; the last being in 1998 for the launch of the all-new Renault Clio. In 2021, Swedish singer Hanna Hägglund recorded a new version of the song, used again by Renault in TV ads to launch its latest version of model Clio.

Chart performance

Weekly charts

Year-end charts

Todd Terje and Bryan Ferry version

Norwegian DJ Todd Terje covered "Johnny and Mary" for his debut studio album It's Album Time. His version features vocals from English musician Bryan Ferry. Terje's version was released as a single on 7 April 2014 as a digital download and peaked at number 185 on the French Singles Chart. It also appears on Ferry's fourteenth studio album, Avonmore.

Track listing

Chart performance

See also
List of number-one singles of 1981 (Spain)

References

1980 songs
1980 singles
2014 singles
Island Records singles
Robert Palmer (singer) songs
Todd Terje songs
Songs written by Robert Palmer (singer)
British synth-pop songs
British new wave songs
Number-one singles in Spain